Cherokee or Tsalagi (ᏣᎳᎩ ᎦᏬᏂᎯᏍᏗ, Tsalagi Gawonihisdi [dʒalaˈɡî ɡawónihisˈdî]) is an endangered-to-moribund Iroquoian language and the native language of the Cherokee people.

All presented prefixes and suffixes will be in the Latin script.

General 
Cherokee is a polysynthetic verb-heavy nominative–accusative language with a non-productive incorporation system. It features both suffixes and prefixes, in contrary to agglutinative languages though, these interact drastically with their surroundings.

Verbs 
Verbs are the most important part and obligatory for a Cherokee sentence. There are two verb-classes comparable to different conjugation types in Latin or Spanish for that their pronoun-prefixes differ in form.

Structure 
To analyze the word formation, a slot system is suited the best. In that sense, every verb possesses the following basic slots. Obligationary parts are marked in bold.

Please note that for every following table only the basic form, sometimes/mostly even without a translation, will be listed to not overload the visual input. Phonemical changes and the meaning depend heavily on context and are better described individually in the following sections. The basic morpheme will be displayed in bold for disambiguation. Here is an overview for the depiction of the context and the following changes:

Initial prefixes (-3) 
The initial prefixes are optionally, but may not occur if they inhabit the same slot or convey contradictive ideas.

Pronoun prefixes (-2) 
As said before, the choice of the pronoun depends on the verb-class, it may either follow set A or set B (also known as set I and set II). These are only present if the verb is intransitive, for transitive verbs one joined set is used. Mark that the exclusive forms are generated by taking the corresponding 2nd person form and adding an "O".

Set I (A) 
(The structure is _C | _V)

Set II (B)

Compound pronouns 
Cherokee verbs mark both subject as well as the direct object. Here the animacy of a third person object is marked. A prominent feature of transitive pronouns is the -y- insertion. Often the pronoun relationship is both ways and can be used for either action, ambiguity is ensured by patterns of changes within the verb stem.

1st person singular object - 'me'

2nd person singular object 'thee' 

Easily recognizable are the forms of the first-to-second person plural and dual. They are produced via a vowel alternation from the second person forms in which former -i- now wields -v-.

3rd person singular animate object 'the other' 

These are basically the set A pronouns, but with a -y- insertion in the singular and an -e- prefix in all forms where the second person is active and non-singular.

3rd person singular inanimate object 'it' set A

3rd person singular inanimate object 'it' set B

1st person dual inclusive object "us both" 

These basically stem from the active forms of the corresponding set B pronouns, but now they represent the direct object instead.

1st person dual exclusive object "me and him/her"

2nd person dual object "you two"

1st person plural inclusive object "us (all)"

1st person plural exclusive object "me and them"

2nd person plural object "you (all)"

3rd person plural animate object "them"

3rd person plural inanimate object "these things" set A

3rd person plural inanimate object "these things" set B

Reflexive marker (-1)

Verbstem (0)

Final and non-final suffixes (1) 
The slots of both final and non-final suffixes cannot be properly dissected and thus the attribute final only means that one of these is obligated at all times. For some suffixes even the exact position is disputed amongst native speakers. In the following table final suffixes are marked bold. Because of the sheer amount of suffixes and the number of exceptions it is more efficient for students to learn the most common fused forms first (mostly those with -'i). Markers of aspect and tense are found in this category.

Nouns 
Nouns are often treated as verbs in the manner of to be someone.

Prefixes 
The number of prefixes nouns can take is comparably smaller than that of verbs, but since nouns can be treated as verbs with the translation of "to be", the same prefixes as with verbs may be used, if not exchanged with one of the three below.

Thus plural words for humans take an(i)- as marker (even if the a was optional).

Conjugation - to be someone 
For persons and their belongings normally set A prefixes are used. The second person forms also serve as vocative.

Possession - to belong to someone 
Every bodypart has to be possessed, unless it is understood as detached or as a general image for example. The bodyparts take both set A and set B prefixes.

Kinship - to be someone in relation to someone 
To explain kinship (or other relationships) the transitive compound pronouns are used. In this case the agent part expresses who it is (ex. I am a father) whilst the formerly patient part indicates to whom the relationship takes place (I-him-father = I, his father).

Suffixes 
The same with the prefixes; the presented suffixes are exclusive for nouns, whilst these can also take numerous verb suffixes.

The coverbal suffixes are applied after the pure noun suffixes.

Adjectives 
Adjectives can also be treated as verbs of certain qualities, they precede the noun they qualify.

Adverbs 
Adverbs are essentially adjectives preceding the qualified verb.

References

Cherokee language
Native American grammars